Pandemis heparana, the dark fruit-tree tortrix or apple brown tortrix, is a moth of the family Tortricidae.

Distribution
This species can be found in most of Europe, in the eastern Palearctic realm, in the Near East,  and in North America.

Description
Pandemis heparana has a wingspan of 16–24 mm. In these moths the basic color of the forewings ranges from yellowish brown to reddish brown, with a reticulate pattern, a dark brown basal fascia, dark brown transversal bands, two triangular spots and brown fringes at the edge. The hindwings are gray-brown with white-yellow fringes. The larva can reach 22 mm and it is pale green.

This species is rather similar to Pandemis cerasana.

Biology
These moths have two generations per year (bivoltine). The moth flies from late May to mid-September in western Europe. The larvae are considered a pest of trees and shrubs. They live in a rolled leaf and are polyphagous, feeding on various deciduous trees and shrubs including oak, willow, birch, honeysuckle, sorbus, apple and pear. Pupation takes places in the rolled leaves.

Gallery

References

External links
 
 
 Waarneming.nl 
 Lepidoptera of Belgium
 Lepiforum.de

Pandemis
Moths of Japan
Tortricidae of Europe
Moths described in 1775